Józef Pankiewicz (29 November 1866, in Lublin – 4 July 1940, in La Ciotat) was a Polish impressionist painter, graphic artist and teacher who spent much of his career in France.

Biography
From 1884 to 1885, he studied at the School of Fine Arts in Warsaw under Wojciech Gerson and Aleksander Kamiński. After obtaining a scholarship, he went to Saint Petersburg to study at the Imperial Academy of Arts. In 1889, he and his studio partner Władysław Podkowiński went to Paris to participate in the Exposition Universelle and he was awarded a silver medal for his painting of a vegetable market.

While there, he was influenced by the impressionists and, when he returned to Poland in 1890, attempted to introduce the latest French trends there. The reaction from critics was largely hostile; one going so far as to advise him to see an optometrist. He persisted, however, and later produced a series of portraits inspired by the work of James McNeill Whistler. His portrait, "Mrs. Oderfeld and her Daughter", won a gold medal at the Exposition Universelle (1900). He was also a frequent exhibitor at the Salon.

In 1897, he became one of the founding members of the Society of Polish Artists "Sztuka". For the next nine years, he travelled continuously throughout Western Europe, until he was appointed a Professor at the Kraków Academy of Fine Arts in 1906. He continued to travel in France, especially along the Mediterranean coast, producing a large series of landscapes and city views which increasingly showed the influence of Paul Cézanne.

During the First World War, he lived in Spain, where he met Robert Delaunay and once again absorbed new post-impressionist influences into his style; notably fauvism. He became the leader of a group of young artists known as the Kapists (Colourists), whose members were opposed to the Romantic tradition in Polish art. In 1923, he returned to the Academy in Kraków. After 1925, he was the Director of its branch in Paris. Among his notable students were Józef Czapski, Alice Halicka, Moïse Kisling, Jan Rubczak, Zygmunt Waliszewski and Wacław Zawadowski.

Between the wars, his style evolved again, becoming more decorative, and he painted a series of still-lifes. He also continued to paint landscapes in Southern France. In 1927, he was named a member of the Legion of Honor. In 1933, he was awarded the Order of Polonia Restituta. A major showing of his works was held at the National Museum to celebrate his seventieth birthday in 1936. The following year, he retired and went to live in La Ciotat, near Marseilles,  where he died.

Selected paintings

References

Further reading
Janusz Janowski, "Józef Pankiewicz wobec „łacińskiej tradycji” malarstwa europejskiego" (Pankiewicz and the "Latin Tradition" in European painting), Pamiętnik Sztuk Pięknych, Nicolaus Copernicus University in Toruń, #1(4), 2003
Elżbieta Charazińska (ed.), Józef Pankiewicz 1866-1940. Życie i dzieło. (exhibition catalog) National Museum, Warsaw, 2006 
Stefania Krzysztofowicz-Kozakowska, Józef Pankiewicz, "Mistrzowie malarstwa polskiego" series, Kluszczyński, 1996

External links

Arcadja Auctions: More works by Pankiewicz.
"Józef Pankiewicz and His Two Nocturnes" @ Niezła Sztuka.

19th-century Polish painters
19th-century Polish male artists
20th-century Polish painters
20th-century Polish male artists
1866 births
1940 deaths
Academy of Fine Arts in Warsaw alumni
Academic staff of the Jan Matejko Academy of Fine Arts
Polish Impressionist painters
Polish emigrants to France
Artists from Lublin
Recipients of the Legion of Honour
Recipients of the Order of Polonia Restituta
Polish male painters